Michael Gerard Hagerty (May 10, 1954 – May 5, 2022) was an American actor.  He was known for playing comedic blue-collar workers, including his recurring roles as Mr. Treeger, the building superintendent, on Friends and the manager of a muffler shop on HBO's Lucky Louie.

Early life
Hagerty was born in Chicago, Illinois, on May 10, 1954.  His family was Irish Catholic, and his father worked as a police officer.  Hagerty completed his primary education at St. Cajetan Elementary School in 1968, before attending Marist High School in his hometown.  He then studied at the University of Illinois at Chicago, where he took acting classes.  Before becoming an actor, Hagerty worked at a restaurant in Evergreen Plaza and a Shell gas station and repair shop on Western Avenue.

Career
Hagerty started acting after being invited by Jim Belushi to join the improv group The Second City.  He went on to co-write and co-star in three revues on the troupe's mainstage during the 1980s (Also Available in Paperback — A Retrospective, Orwell That Ends Well, and True Midwest, or No, But I Saw the Movie).  He also introduced the lyrics of "Bear Down, Chicago Bears" to its cast and had them memorize and sing the song.  He subsequently began acting in films and television shows, beginning with Doctor Detroit in 1983.  Hagerty became known for his mustache and thick Chicago accent.

Although the majority of his career was spent in television, Hagerty had small roles in many films, and ultimately garnered over 100 acting credits throughout his career.  He was recognized for his small character roles in a wide range of popular comedies, including Martin, Cheers, The Wayans Bros., Curb Your Enthusiasm, Friends, Seinfeld, and The Wonder Years.  He was one of twenty actors to appear in both Friends and Seinfeld.  Hagerty was also a regular on The George Carlin Show, which was his first recurring television role.  One of his final acting roles was Somebody Somewhere, which he was still filming at the time of his death.

Personal life
Hagerty was married to Mary Kathryn until his death.  They met during their early twenties while working at a small theater in Chicago, and he reportedly took her to Ireland to propose to her on New Year's Eve.

Hagerty relocated to Los Angeles during the 1980s.  He nonetheless maintained ties to his hometown, appearing at community fundraisers at the Beverly Arts Center and the local Catholic church.  He was scheduled to be in Naperville, Illinois, and adjacent neighborhoods to start filming the second season of Somebody Somewhere shortly before his death.

Hagerty died on May 5, 2022, while in a coma, at Cedars-Sinai Medical Center in Los Angeles after suffering from a seizure.  He was 67. His seizure was caused by an adverse reaction to antibiotics he was taking for an infection in his leg.

Filmography

Film

Television

Video games

References

External links

1954 births
2022 deaths
Male actors from Chicago
University of Illinois Chicago alumni
American male film actors
American male television actors